Lasionycta anthracina is a moth of the family Noctuidae. It is found from the east coast of Labrador to north-eastern Alberta, southward to northern New Hampshire and Lake Superior in western Ontario.

It is found in boreal forests and bogs.

The wingspan is 22–27 mm for males and 25–29 mm for females. Adults are on wing from mid-June to mid-August.

External links
A Revision of Lasionycta Aurivillius (Lepidoptera, Noctuidae) for North America and notes on Eurasian species, with descriptions of 17 new species, 6 new subspecies, a new genus, and two new species of Tricholita Grote

Lasionycta
Moths described in 2009